Shadrinsk Automotive Components is a company based in Shadrinsk, Russia. It is part of the Ural Mining and Metallurgical Company.

The Automotive Components company is a long-time producer of components and accessories for military and civil motor vehicles. For conversion it has been diversifying into products for the home kitchen, for gardeners, and for campers and travelers.

References

External links
 Official website

Manufacturing companies of Russia
Companies based in Kurgan Oblast
Ural Mining and Metallurgical Company
Ministry of the Motor Vehicle Industry (Soviet Union)
Manufacturing companies of the Soviet Union
Defence companies of the Soviet Union
Auto parts suppliers of Russia
Automotive companies of the Soviet Union